The 1837 Poonch Revolt, also known as the 1837 Poonch Rebellion, was a revolt in the princely state of Poonch against the Sikh Empire's Dogra rulers, Raja Dhian Singh and Raja Gulab Singh. The revolt took place in the Poonch Division of Pakistani dependent territory of Azad Kashmir.

History 
In 1837, after Hari Singh Nalwa's death in the Battle of Jamrud, the Sudhan tribe of Poonch rose in revolt with other tribes and Pahari-speaking people. The insurgency was led by Shams Khan.  and former confidential follower of Dhian Singh. Shams Khan's betrayal of the regime was taken personally; Gulab Singh was given the task of suppressing the rebellion. 

After defeating the insurgents in Hazara and the Murree hills, Gulab Singh stayed at Kahuta to subdue the insurgents. Shams Khan and his nephew Raj Wali Khan were betrayed and were decapitated as they slept. Meanwhile, the lieutenants were captured, flayed alive, and put to death. 

Contemporary British commentators stated that the local population suffered immensely. Many rebels were captured and treated vengefully — their hands and feet were severed. The skin of Mali Khan and Sabz Ali Khan, two of Shams's close accomplices, was peeled off their bodies and their heads were hung on a gallows in a crossroad to deter others. The rebel chief was also decapitated.

References

Kashmir conflict
Dogra
Azad Kashmir
Poonch District, Pakistan